Charles Edward Henderson (19 January 1907 – 7 March 1970) was a songwriter, arranger, vocal coach and lyricist. He and Alfred Newman were nominated for the Academy Award for Best Music (Scoring of a Musical Picture) in 1945 for State Fair.

Henderson was born in Boston, Massachusetts and died in Laguna Beach, California.

Notable works 
Fantasia (1940) (choral arrangements for the Ave Maria sequence)
Dumbo (1941) (vocal arrangements for "Song of the Roustabouts")
Bambi (1942) (choral arrangements)
The Bishop's Wife (1947) (vocal director)
The Enemy Below (1957) (vocal supervisor)
The Music Man (1962) (vocal arranger)
"Deep Night" (composer)
"The Right Kind" (composer)

Broadway theatre
Blackouts of 1949 (1949); music also by Royal Foster

Film music
The Rage of Paris (1938)

Books 
 Henderson, Charles, with Charles Palmer (1939). How to Sing for Money: The Art and Business of Singing Popular Songs Professionally. Hollywood, Calif.: G Palmer Putnam.  .

Citations

External links 
 
 

1907 births
1970 deaths
American male songwriters
20th-century male musicians